Yejong of Joseon (12 February 1450 – 31 December 1469), personal name Yi Hwang (Korean: 이황; Hanja: 李晄), firstly titled Grand Prince Haeyang (Korean: 해양대군; Hanja: 海陽大君), was the eighth ruler of the Joseon dynasty of Korea. He succeeded his father, King Sejo, in 1468, when he was 18 years old, but was too physically ill to govern, and died a year later.

One of the most prominent incidents during his reign was the trial and death of General Nam I (남이, 南怡), who was famous for having suppressed Yi Si-ae's Rebellion along with General Gang Sun (강순, 康純). At the age of 28, Nam I was appointed as Minister of Military Affairs. However, when Yejong took the throne, Yu Ja-gwang (유자광, 柳子光), who was jealous of Nam I, accused him of treason when he found out that the king himself was not fond of the general. Yu also involved Gang Sun and initiated a trial witnessed by Yejong. They were found guilty and executed, while Yu Ja-gwang was promoted to a high office. After this incident, there were many cases where Yu accused ministers who were apparently more prestigious than himself.

Biography
He was born in 1450 as the second son of Grand Prince Suyang (a King Sejo was known at the time) and his primary consort, Lady Yun of the Papyeong Yun clan (later Queen Jeonghui). He was promoted to crown prince at the age of 7, after the sudden death of his elder brother, Crown Prince Uigyeong.

In 1468, his father abdicated, but since Yi Hwang was not yet 20 years old and had been physically weak since his childhood, his mother, Queen Dowager Jaseong, came to unofficially rule the nation instead. According to records of this era, political decisions were taken by the queen and three subjects nominated by King Sejo.

Although his reign lasted just 14 months, several incidents had occurred. In 1468, the treason of Nam I greatly influenced the court politics. Just before his death in 1469, Joseon started to prohibit all trade with Japan. Yi Hwang also granted common farmers the right to cultivate fields which originally belonged to the military.

He died shortly before his 20th birthday and was buried alongside his second wife, Queen Ansun, in the Seooneung Cluster located in Goyang, Gyeonggi Province. Their tomb is known as Changneung (창릉).

After Yejong's death, the throne was not inherited by his son. Instead, his nephew and the second son of Crown Prince Uigyeong, Grand Prince Jalsan, became the heir and was poshumously honored as King Seongjong.

Both of Yejong's sons, Grand Prince Inseong and Grand Prince Jean, died without issue. In 1874, during the reign of Gojong, Yi Ong, Prince Seoseong of the Third Junior Rank (서성부정 이옹) (1487 – 1510) and a great-great-grandson of Sejong the Great, was posthumously appointed as heir to Grand Prince Inseong; similarly, Yi Pa (이파) (1515 – 1571), a great-great-grandson of Jeongjong of Joseon, was also granted the title Prince Nakpung (Nakpung Gun; 낙풍군) and became heir to Grand Prince Jean.

Family
Father: King Sejo of Joseon (조선 세조) (2 November 1417 – 23 September 1468)
Grandfather: King Sejong of Joseon (조선 세종) (15 May 1397 – 8 April 1450)
Grandmother: Queen Soheon of the Cheongsong Shim clan (소헌왕후 심씨) (12 October 1395 – 19 April 1446)
Mother: Queen Jeonghui of the Papyeong Yun clan (정희왕후 윤씨) (8 December 1418 – 6 May 1483)
Grandfather: Yun Beon (윤번) (1384 – 1448)
Grandmother: Lady Yi of the Incheon Yi clan (인천 이씨) (1383 – 1456)
Consorts and their respective issue(s):
 Queen Jangsun of the Cheongju Han clan (장순왕후 한씨) (22 February 1445 – 5 January 1462)
 Yi Bun, Grand Prince Inseong (인성대군 이분) (31 December 1461 – 4 December 1463), first son
 Queen Ansun of the Cheongju Han clan (안순왕후 한씨) (12 March 1445 – 3 February 1499)
 Princess Hyeonsuk (현숙공주) (1464 – May 1502), first daughter
 Yi Hyeon, Grand Prince Jean (제안대군 이현) (13 February 1466 – 14 December 1525), second son
 Third son
 Princess Hyesun (혜순공주) (September 1468 – 5 August 1469), second daughter
 Royal Noble Consort Gong of the Jeonju Choe clan (공빈 최씨)
 Court Lady Gi (상궁 기씨)
 Concubine Yi (후궁 이씨)

Ancestry

In popular culture
 Portrayed by Lee Young-hoo in the 1998–2000 KBS TV series King and Queen.
Portrayed by Yoo Dong-hyuk in the 2007–2008 SBS TV series The King and I.
Portrayed by Noh Young-hak in the 2011–2012 JTBC TV series Insu, the Queen Mother.
Portrayed by Lee Sun-kyun in the 2017 movie The King's Case Note.

See also
List of monarchs of Korea

Notes

15th-century Korean monarchs
1450 births
1469 deaths